An adapter or adaptor, or a linker in genetic engineering is a short, chemically synthesized, single-stranded or double-stranded oligonucleotide that can be ligated to the ends of other DNA or RNA molecules. Double stranded adapters can be synthesized to have blunt ends to both terminals or to have sticky end at one end and blunt end at the other. For instance, a double stranded DNA adapter can be used to link the ends of two other DNA molecules (i.e., ends that do not have "sticky ends", that is complementary protruding single strands by themselves). It may be used to add sticky ends to cDNA allowing it to be ligated into the plasmid much more efficiently. Two adapters could base pair to each other to form dimers.
A conversion adapter is used to join a DNA insert cut with one restriction enzyme,  say EcoRl, with a vector opened with another enzyme, Bam Hl. This adapter can be used to convert the cohesive end produced by Bam Hl to one produced by Eco Rl or vice versa.
One of its applications is ligating cDNA into a plasmid or other vectors instead of using Terminal deoxynucleotide Transferase enzyme to add poly A to the cDNA fragment.

References

Genetic engineering